Oskar Fredriksen (4 July 1870 – 16 August 1920) was a Norwegian speedskater.

In 1890 he became the first registered world record holder in the 5,000-meter race. He did it again in 1893 in the 10,000-meter race. In 1894 Fredriksen set a world record in the 500-meter race with a time of 47.8 seconds.

World records 

Source: SpeedSkatingStats.com

References

1870 births
1920 deaths
Norwegian male speed skaters
World record setters in speed skating